Ali Abbas may refer to:

 Syed Ali Abbas Jalalpuri (1914–1998), Pakistani professor of philosophy
 Ali Abbas Zafar (born 1982), Indian film director and screenwriter
 Ali Abbas (actor) (born 1984), Pakistani television actor
 Ali Abbas (footballer) (born 1986), Iraqi Australian footballer
 Ali Ismail Abbas (born 1991), Iraqi man injured during the 2003 invasion of Iraq